Spencer Smythe is a supervillain appearing in American comic books published by Marvel Comics, usually as an adversary of the superhero Spider-Man as well as the father of Alistair Smythe. A scientist researching robotics and arachnids, he turned to crime to finance his research, and dedicated his life to capturing Spider-Man. He is best known for creating the Spider-Slayers, robots designed specifically to hunt down, capture, or kill the web-slinger. 

The character has appeared in several Spider-Man adaptations, including animated series and video games.

Publication history
Spencer Smythe and the Spider-Slayers first appeared in The Amazing Spider-Man #25 (June 1965) and were created by Stan Lee and Steve Ditko.

Fictional character biography
Spencer Smythe is an expert in robotics and arachnids who asked J. Jonah Jameson to fund his projects, having been convinced by Jameson's editorials that Spider-Man was a menace. After watching a demonstration showing that Smythe's robot could sense and track spiders, Jameson hired Smythe to capture Spider-Man. Jameson himself controlled the robot, meaning that Spider-Man was chased by a machine with Jameson's face. However, the web-slinger escaped by leaving the Spider-Man suit wrapped in the robot's tentacles.

Annoyed at his robot's inability to capture Spider-Man, Smythe began to obsess about the web-slinger, turning to crime to finance his research and constantly improving his robots which he dubbed Spider-Slayers. But his creations, no matter how deadly or powerful he made, were always defeated by Spider-Man utilizing a key flaw in their designs.

Eventually, Smythe's criminal career came to an end when the radioactive materials used in the robots' manufacture poisoned him, dooming him to a slow and agonizing death. Blaming Spider-Man and Jameson equally for his impending demise, Smythe handcuffed the two together with a bomb scheduled to detonate in 24 hours, determined to make the two suffer the agony of inescapable death that he saw the two as having condemned him to. Unfortunately for Smythe, his disease was too advanced for him to survive the 24 hours himself, and he died convinced that he had killed off the two responsible. Peter Parker, however, had a pretty good grasp of what made mechanical devices tick, and was able to abort the bomb by freezing its controls mere moments before it would have detonated.

After Spencer's death, his son Alistair Smythe inherited the Spider-Slayer legacy.

During the Dead No More: The Clone Conspiracy storyline, a clone of the character is created by Miles Warren's company New U Technologies.

Skills and abilities
Spencer Smythe is quite intelligent, capable of designing advanced robots that could pursue solitary targets. These robots were physically dangerous enough to overpower Spider-Man at multiple points, but they lacked A.I. software.

In other media

Television
 A character inspired by Spencer Smythe named Henry Smythe appears in the Spider-Man (1967) episode "Captured by J. Jonah Jameson", voiced by Henry Ramer. Similarly to Spencer, he is the creator of the Spider-Slayers.
 Spencer Smythe appeared in Spider-Man: The Animated Series, voiced by Edward Mulhare. He is enlisted by Norman Osborn to capture Spider-Man in exchange for building a hover-chair for his paralyzed son Alistair Smythe. Spencer creates his first Spider-Slayer, the Black Widow, to achieve this, but it instead kidnaps Flash Thompson, who was wearing a Spider-Man costume at the time. When the real Spider-Man comes to the rescue, the ensuing battle leads to a fire at Oscorp. With Osborn's negative reinforcement, Spencer stays behind to ensure Spider-Man dies and Alistair gets the hover-chair, but is seemingly killed when Oscorp explodes. Later in the series, it is revealed that Spencer survived and was put into cryogenic suspension by the Kingpin to ensure Alistair's loyalty after the latter fell in with the crime lord. Alistair eventually discovers Spencer and recovers him with Spider-Man's help. Afterwards, Alistair works for various resourceful individuals in exchange for his father's revival.
 Spencer Smythe appears in Spider-Man (2017), voiced by Benjamin Diskin. This version is Peter Parker's strict science teacher at Midtown High School and Alistair Smythe's estranged father. Hired by Norman Osborn, he sabotages Anya Corazon's experiment and frames Harry Osborn for the deed, resulting in Harry's suspension from Horizon High. Smythe next allies himself with the Vulture to seek revenge against Max Modell and creates his personal Spider-Slayer to steal Harry's work from Horizon High before being destroyed by Spider-Man. While bitter that Osborn reneged on his deal, Spencer is hired by Raymond Warren to steal Oscorp's genetically modified spiders. His Spider-Slayer threatens Oscorp as a distraction while he leave with the spiders, but bumps into Miles Morales and loses a specimen. Spencer personally operates a mecha-sized Spider-Slayer to capture the Ultimate Spider-Man, but ends up fighting the Ultimate Spider-Slayer. The Smythes are eventually defeated by the two Spider-Men, though only Spencer is arrested while his son escapes.

Video games
 Spencer Smythe appears in the PS2 and PSP versions of Spider-Man: Web of Shadows. This version is aligned with A.I.M. and the Jackal, with the former helping him in his secret experiments and the latter eventually betraying him upon learning Smythe intends to find a way to control the invading symbiotes.
 Spencer Smythe appears in Marvel Heroes.
 Spencer Smythe replaces Alistair in the Nintendo 3DS version of The Amazing Spider-Man. Similarly to his son in other versions of the game, he utilizes multiple Spider-Slayers and robots in failed attempts to kill Spider-Man and Curt Connors.

References

External links
 

Characters created by Stan Lee
Characters created by Steve Ditko
Comics characters introduced in 1965
Fictional cryonically preserved characters in comics
Fictional inventors
Marvel Comics scientists
Marvel Comics male supervillains
Marvel Comics supervillains
Spider-Man characters